Naxatra News Hindi is an Indian 24-Hour Hindi news broadcasting channel focusing on Jharkhand and Bihar. It is headquartered in Ranchi, Jharkhand for the states of Bihar, Jharkhand and the Hindi speaking areas of West Bengal and Odisha.

The channel went on air on 20 May 2012 and is widely distributed through multi-system operators and local cable operators. It has one of the widest coverage areas among the channels in Jharkhand and Bihar. It has a host of entertainment, educative and informative programmes. Naxatra News has five regional, three national and two Jet News bulletins interspersed with the programmes.

Naxatra News Hindi is a joint venture between Gurukul Media led by Mr Sinha and N.K Media Ventures of Odisha led by Mr Mallick. It has one of the largest studios in Eastern India. Naxatra News is also planning to launch a newspaper.

Satellite 

 Orbital location: 83 degrees East
 Downlink polarization: horizontal
 FEC: 3/4
 Downlink frequency: 3873 MHz
 Symbol rate: 3400 MSPS

Popular shows 

 Do Took
 Indepth                                                                                                                     
 Health Naxatra
 Vaastu

References 

 https://web.archive.org/web/20130823103031/http://naxatranewshindi.com/
 http://www.lyngsat-logo.com/tvchannel/in/Naxatra-News-Hindi.html

External links 
 Official website

Satellite television